Jahre is a surname. Notable people with the surname include:

Anders Jahre (1891–1982), Norwegian shipping magnate
Henrik Jahre (born 1937), Norwegian politician 
Jørgen Jahre (1907–1998), Norwegian shipowner and sports official
Tuulikki Jahre (born 1951), Swedish cyclist

See also
Mahre